Somatidia convexa is a species of beetle in the family Cerambycidae. It was described by Broun in 1893. It is known from New Zealand. It contains the varietas Somatidia convexa var. sericophora.

References

convexa
Beetles described in 1893